Colonel (Col) is a Canadian Forces rank used by commissioned officers in the Canadian Army and Royal Canadian Air Force. Captain(N) is the equivalent rank in the Royal Canadian Navy. A colonel is senior to the army and air force rank of lieutenant-colonel or the naval rank of commander, and junior to the army and air force rank of brigadier-general or the naval rank of commodore.

Insignia 
Before unification of the Canadian Forces in 1968, rank structure and insignia followed the British pattern.

Appointments 
Typical appointments for colonels include:
 Base commander (BComd)
 Wing commander (Wg Comd)
 Commanding officer of a school or training establishment, such as commandant of the Canadian Army Command and Staff College, or commander of Combat Training Centre Gagetown
 Commander of a brigade group
 Branch advisor
 Military attaché to foreign nations

The rank insignia for air force uniform is four  stripes, worn on the cuffs of the service dress jacket, and on slip-ons on other uniforms. The insignia for army uniform is two stars and a crown. The insignia worn on the headdress for an army colonel is the crest of the Canadian coat of arms: a crowned gold lion with a maple leaf in its paw standing on a red-and-white wreath, all beneath the royal crown; the collar insignia is two crossed sabres. Some colonels, by nature of holding a specific appointment, may continue to wear the insignia of their personnel branch or regiment; for example, the honorary colonel of an infantry regiment. Air force colonels wear the badge of their personnel branch (most often the Air Operations Branch) on their headdress.

Colonels are addressed by rank and name; thereafter by subordinates as "Sir" or "Ma'am".

Honorary ranks and appointments 
There are also several honorary ranks and appointments associated with the rank of colonel, or containing the word "colonel" in their title.
 Colonel-in-chief
 Colonel of the regiment
 Honorary colonel
 Colonel commandant

Personnel holding these honorary ranks are not part of the military operational chain of command. Rather, they serve in a ceremonial manner, often as a guest of honour at parades, mess dinners, or at other military traditions such as during Remembrance Day. Usually, honorary ranks are filled by people who have had a prior association with the battalion, regiment, or squadron they represent. Princess Patricia of Connaught was the colonel-in-chief of Princess Patricia's Canadian Light Infantry, one of the most decorated infantry regiments in the Canadian Forces (CF). An honorary colonel of a CF flying or air maintenance squadron may be a past commanding officer of that squadron (who has since retired from active duty), or an air ace during the war.

References

Military insignia
Military ranks of Canada